Shane's Chess Information Database (Scid) is a free and open source UNIX, Windows, Linux, and Mac application for viewing and maintaining large databases of chess games. It has features comparable to popular commercial chess software. Scid is written in Tcl/Tk and C++.

Scid has undergone several stages of development. Firstly by Shane Hudson, and then Pascal Georges.

Features 

Scid is a powerful Chess Toolkit with many features. It can interface with XBoard engines (such as Crafty and GNU Chess), and UCI engines (e.g. Fruit, Rybka and Stockfish). Using Scid, one may play games against human opponents (on the Free Internet Chess Server), or computer opponents. Database features include a Move Tree with statistics, Player Information and Photos, and General Searches for specific endings (e.g. pawn vs. rook or rook vs. queen), positions or players. It has a database with 1.4 million games (ScidBase).

Scid's speed is due to its storing chess games in its own compact database format (si4), but it also supports the popular portable game notation (PGN).

Related software 
There are multiple projects related to Scid, all using the si4 database format. ChessDB was the first Scid fork. Scid vs. PC has been in development since 2009, and has an improved interface. Its major new feature is a Computer Tournament mode and also includes rewritten Gamelist, FICS and Analysis widgets. ChessX replaces Tcl/Tk with Qt. Scidb (written in Tcl/C++), implements many chess variants and many read/write formats.

Scid on the go is a browser for Scid database files for Android.

See also 

 ChessBase
 Chess engines
 Chess Assistant
 Chess Informant

References

External links 
 Scid homepage
 Scid vs. PC
 Scidb
 ChessDB
 ChessX
 Jose-chess
 Video guide to using SCID

Free chess software
Chess databases
Software that uses Tk (software)